Globus is Latin for sphere or globe. It may also refer to:

Business
 Globus Medical, a medical device company in Audubon, PA
 Globus (clothing retailer), an Indian clothing retail store
 Globus (company), a Swiss department store chain
 Globus (hypermarket), a hypermarket chain in Germany, the Czech Republic and Russia
 Globus Alliance, an engineering association for grid computing infrastructure
 Globus Toolkit, software that implements specifications proposed by the Globus Alliance

Transportation
 Tata Globus, a range of buses by Tata Motors
 Globus Airlines, a Russian airline
 Globus family of brands, a group of travel package companies

Media
 Globus (weekly), a political magazine published in Croatia
 Globus (Macedonian magazine)

Medicine
 Globus pallidus, a sub-cortical structure in the brain
 Globus pharyngis (also globus sensation or globus hystericus), a feeling of a lump at the back of the throat

People
 Amy Globus, American artist and entrepreneur
 Globus, nickname of Odilo Globocnik, a World War II Nazi and SS leader
 Solomon Globus (born 1856), Lithuanian chess master
 Stephen Globus, New York City venture capitalist
 Yoram Globus (born 1941), Israeli film producer

Other uses
 Globe, a three-dimensional scale model of Earth
 GLOBUS, a radar system in Norway
 Globus (music), the commercial name of a mix of producers, musicians, and vocalists from the movie trailer music production company Immediate Music
 Globus cruciger, an orb topped with a cross, a Christian symbol
 Voskhod Spacecraft "Globus" IMP navigation instrument
 Globus Institute for Globalisation and Sustainable Development at Tilburg University, the Netherlands

See also

 Globe (disambiguation)
 Gobus (disambiguation)